Cornelis "Cees" Koch (born 30 December 1925) is a Dutch sprint canoeist who competed from the late 1940s to the late 1950s. Competing in two Summer Olympics, he earned his best finish of sixth in the K-2 10000 m event at London in 1948. He was born in Zaandam.

References
 
 

1925 births
Living people
Dutch male canoeists
Olympic canoeists of the Netherlands
Canoeists at the 1948 Summer Olympics
Canoeists at the 1952 Summer Olympics
Sportspeople from Zaanstad
20th-century Dutch people
21st-century Dutch people